Devario naganensis is a freshwater fish endemic to the Chindwin River basin in Manipur and Nagaland, Northeast India; its range could extend into Myanmar. It grows to  total length.

References

Devario
Cyprinid fish of Asia
Freshwater fish of India
Endemic fauna of India
Fish described in 1912
Taxa named by Banawari Lal Chaudhuri